The 2020–21 Primeira Liga (also known as Liga NOS for sponsorship reasons) was the 87th season of the Primeira Liga, the top professional league for Portuguese association football clubs. The season started later than usual, on 18 September 2020, due to the delayed end of the previous season caused by the COVID-19 pandemic, and it concluded on 19 May 2021.

This was the fourth Primeira Liga season to use video assistant referee (VAR). As was the case at the end of the previous season, there were limited or no attendance in the stadiums besides each team's staff and personnel.

Porto were the defending champions. Nacional and Farense were promoted from the second-tier 2019–20 LigaPro by decision of the Liga Portuguesa de Futebol Profissional, after the suspension of the 2019–20 LigaPro due to the COVID-19 pandemic in Portugal. They replaced Desportivo das Aves and Vitória de Setúbal, who were relegated to the 2020–21 Campeonato de Portugal.

On 11 May 2021, Sporting CP secured a 19th title after a 1–0 home win against Boavista, their first title since the 2001–02 season. It was also the first title since that season not being won by either Benfica or Porto.

Since Portugal ascended from seventh to sixth place in the UEFA association coefficient rankings at the end of 2019–20 season, only the three best-ranked teams could qualify for the UEFA Champions League (the champions and runners-up entered directly into the group stage, and the third placed team entered the third qualifying round). The fourth and fifth-placed teams would qualified respectively to the UEFA Europa Conference League play-off and third qualifying rounds.

Effects of the COVID-19 pandemic
Due to the COVID-19 pandemic in Portugal, since March 2020, in contrast with various European leagues, the Primeira Liga began playing matches behind closed doors. On 13 September, Sporting confirmed that three players had tested positive for coronavirus, leading their pre-season match against Napoli to be cancelled due to the orders of the Portuguese Ministry of Health. The following day, Sporting confirmed that four players and a member of their staff had tested positive for coronavirus. Meanwhile, Gil Vicente confirmed that fifteen players had tested positive for coronavirus, leading also their pre-season match against Vitória de Guimarães to be cancelled. Three days later, Sporting confirmed that their manager Ruben Amorim and another player tested positive for coronavirus, with both going into self-isolation. On 17 September, it was announced that the Gil Vicente and Sporting fixture on matchday 1 would be postponed, following direct orders from the Portuguese Ministry of Health, after it was confirmed that Gil Vicente had four more positive cases of coronavirus.
 
On 3 October, Santa Clara faced Gil Vicente on matchday 3 at the Estádio de São Miguel, in Ponta Delgada, Azores, in a match, which was the first one to allow spectators in Portugal, with the stadium being limited to 10% of its capacity (1,000 spectators). Ten days later, it was announced that Paços de Ferreira's manager Pepa had tested positive for COVID-19, leading him and his staff being placed in quarantine as a preventive measure, forcing him to miss Paços de Ferreira's match against Santa Clara on October 18 at matchday 4.

On matchday 5, played between 23 and 26 October, there were three matches in which spectatores were allowed: Tondela against Portimonense at Estádio João Cardoso, Santa Clara against Sporting at the Estádio de São Miguel (with spectators being allowed for the second consecutive match) and Farense against Rio Ave at Estádio Algarve, where Farense played their first three home matches, instead of their regular home stadium Estádio de São Luís, due to a turf change.
Like the match against Gil Vicente, Santa Clara match was played with the stadium capacity limited to 10%, as the other two matches were limited to 15% (approximately 750 and 4,500 spectators in Estádio João Cardoso and Estádio Algarve, respectively).

Santa Clara announced on February 20 that spectators will be allowed in Estádio de São Miguel, for the third time this season, in the match against Paços de Ferreira on matchday 21, played one week later on 27 February. This time, one third of the stadium's maximum capacity was allowed.

Teams
Eighteen teams competed in the league – the top sixteen teams from the previous season and two teams promoted from the LigaPro. Nacional and Farense were promoted on 5 May 2020 by decision of the Liga Portuguesa de Futebol Profissional, after the suspension of the 2019–20 LigaPro due to the COVID-19 pandemic in Portugal. This decision was made based on UEFA's recommendations, focusing on sporting merit, as these teams were in first and second place of the LigaPro, respectively, at the time of cancellation.

Nacional came back to the top division one season after being relegated, while Farense secured their return after an 18-year absence. They replaced Desportivo das Aves and Vitória de Setúbal, who were relegated after three and sixteen seasons in the top flight, respectively.

Stadia and locations

Personnel and sponsors

Managerial changes

League table

Relegation play-offs
The relegation play-offs took place on 26 and 30 May 2021.

All times are WEST (UTC+1).

|}

Arouca won 5–0 on aggregate and were promoted to 2021–22 Primeira Liga; Rio Ave were relegated to 2021–22 Liga Portugal 2.

Results

Positions by round
The table lists the positions of teams after each week of matches. In order to preserve chronological evolvements, any postponed matches are not included to the round at which they were originally scheduled, but added to the full round they were played immediately afterwards.

Statistics

Top goalscorers

Hat-tricks

Notes
(H) – Home team(A) – Away team

Top assists

Clean sheets

Discipline

Player 
 Most yellow cards: 13
 Nicolás Otamendi (Benfica)
 Fábio Pacheco (Moreirense)
 Most red cards: 2
 Salvador Agra (Tondela)
 Chidozie Awaziem (Boavista)
 David Carmo (Braga)
 Júlio César (Nacional)
 Rafael Defendi (Farense)
 Fransérgio (Braga)
 Javi García (Boavista)
 Stanislav Kritsyuk (Belenenses)
 Ygor Nogueira (Gil Vicente)

Club 
 Most yellow cards: 102
Marítimo
 Most red cards: 10
Boavista

Awards

Monthly awards
For the 2020–21 season, there were seven monthly awards in the Primeira Liga: best player, goalkeeper, defender, midfielder, forward, manager and goal of the month.

Annual awards
Annual awards were announced on 8 July 2021.

Number of teams by district

Notes

References

Primeira Liga seasons
Portugal
1